Caroline Rowland may refer to:

Caroline Rowland (filmmaker), British-Swiss filmmaker
Caroline Ann Rowland (1852–1912), Australian nun
Caroline F. Rowland (born 1971), British psychologist